Juan Manuel Gómez Sánchez (born 29 May 1981), known as Juanma, is a Spanish former professional footballer who played as a right midfielder.

Club career
Juanma was born in Don Benito, Province of Badajoz. During his early career, he represented Málaga CF, playing with both its first and second teams. In the summer of 2004 he joined Levante UD for four years, making his La Liga debut on 26 September in a 4–3 away loss against Real Zaragoza; he would finish the season with five goals, but the side was relegated.

After a loan stint with Recreativo de Huelva, Juanma returned to the Valencian Community club, in another relegation-ending campaign. On 6 August 2008 he moved to Real Betis on a four-year contract for roughly €1 million, scoring his first goal for the Andalusians in late October against CD Castellón in a 2–0 away victory over CD Castellón in the round of 32 of the Copa del Rey. In the domestic league he netted twice in 27 games, against Valencia CF (3–2 away defeat) and Getafe CF (2–2 home draw), but, for the third time in four years, he dropped down a division.

After an unassuming five-month spell at Villarreal CF, the 32-year-old Juanma signed a one-year deal with Deportivo Alavés in August 2013, retiring after two Segunda División seasons and 54 competitive matches. He subsequently worked as a youth coach, with CD Ariznabarra.

References

External links

1981 births
Living people
People from Don Benito
Sportspeople from the Province of Badajoz
Spanish footballers
Footballers from Extremadura
Association football midfielders
La Liga players
Segunda División players
Segunda División B players
Tercera División players
Atlético Malagueño players
CD Don Benito players
Málaga CF players
Levante UD footballers
Recreativo de Huelva players
Real Betis players
Villarreal CF players
Deportivo Alavés players